Tweedy's crab-eating rat (Ichthyomys tweedii) is a species of rodent in the family Cricetidae.
It is found in two disjoint regions in western Ecuador and central Panama. The species is found near fast-flowing streams in primary and secondary forest, and is known from elevations of 900 to 1700 m. It is presumed that like other members of its genus, it nocturnal and semiaquatic, and feeds on freshwater invertebrates, such as crabs. This rodent is threatened by habitat destruction and water pollution.

References

Ichthyomys
Rodents of Central America
Mammals of Ecuador
Rat, Tweedy's crab-eating
Mammals described in 1921
Taxonomy articles created by Polbot